Michael Vivian Fyfe Pennington (born 7 June 1943) is a British actor, director and writer. Together with director Michael Bogdanov, he founded the English Shakespeare Company in 1986 and was its Joint Artistic Director until 1992. He has written ten books, directed in the UK, US, Romania and Japan, and is an Honorary Associate Artist of the Royal Shakespeare Company. He is popularly known as Moff Jerjerrod in the original Star Wars trilogy film Return of the Jedi.

Background
Pennington was born in Cambridge, the son of Vivian Maynard Cecil Pennington (died 1984) and Euphemia Willock, née Fyfe (died 1987), and grew up in London. He was educated at Marlborough College, became a member of the National Youth Theatre and then read English at Trinity College, Cambridge.

Theatre work
He joined the Royal Shakespeare Company on graduation and remained in a junior capacity from 1964 to 1966, playing among other things Fortinbras in David Warner's 1965 Hamlet. He then left the company for eight years and worked in London, both on the stage (in John Mortimer's The Judge, Christopher Hampton's Savages and Tony Richardson's production of Hamlet with Nicol Williamson), and on TV in many single dramas. He returned to the RSC in 1974 to play Angelo in Measure for Measure, beginning a relationship with the company as a leading actor which culminated in his own performance of Hamlet in 1980/81: he also played Berowne in Love's Labour's Lost, Edgar in King Lear, and in new work by David Rudkin, David Edgar and Howard Brenton and classic works by Sean O'Casey, Euripides and William Congreve. He then left the company for a further eight years before appearing in Stephen Poliakoff's Playing with Trains, and ten years after that in the title role of Timon of Athens. In the meanwhile he appeared at the National Theatre in 1984 in Tolstoy's Strider, for which he was nominated for an Olivier Award, in Thomas Otway's Venice Preserv'd, and also premiered his solo show Anton Chekhov which he has been regularly touring internationally ever since. He also played Raskolnikov in Yuri Lyubimov's famous adaptation of Crime and Punishment, and Henry in Tom Stoppard's The Real Thing in London's West End and played the title role in Sophocles' Oedipus Rex on BBC TV in 1985.

In 1986, Pennington and director Michael Bogdanov together founded the English Shakespeare Company. As joint artistic director, he starred in the company's inaugural productions of The Henrys and, in 1987, the seven-play history cycle of The Wars of the Roses, which toured worldwide and was televised. Pennington played such parts as Richard II, Prince Hal/Henry V and Jack Cade (Olivier Award Nomination). In subsequent seasons with the ESC, he played Leontes in The Winter's Tale and the title roles in Macbeth and Coriolanus (Olivier Award Nomination) and directed Twelfth Night, which he then also directed for the Haiyuza Theatre Company in Tokyo and for the Chicago Shakespeare Theatre.

Since the 1970s, he has appeared frequently with Judi Dench and also with her husband Michael Williams. The third time he played opposite Dench was in Peter Shaffer's play The Gift of the Gorgon, in 1992, in which they appeared as a married couple. His other West End work in the 1990s included Archie Rice in The Entertainer, Claudius and the Ghost in Hamlet, Major Arnold in Taking Sides (Ronald Harwood), Oscar Wilde in Gross Indecency, Sir John Brute in Farquhar'sThe Provok’d Wife, Henry Trebell in Harley Granville Barker's Waste, Trigorin in The Seagull, and the title role in Molière's The Misanthrope. In the first Harold Pinter Festival in Dublin he played in Pinter's Old Times and One for the Road. In 1998, he worked with Sir Peter Hall and other actors to run a workshop at the National Theatre Studio, which received considerable plaudits.

His stage work in the 2000s included Joe Orton's What the Butler Saw (National tour), the title role in
The Guardsman (West End), David Mamet's The Shawl (Crucible Theatre Sheffield), Walter Burns in The Front Page, (Chichester Festival Theatre), the title roles in Ibsen's John Gabriel Borkman and Alan Bennett's The Madness of George III, and Dr Dorn in Chekhov's The Seagull, directed by Peter Stein for the Edinburgh Festival)
In 2003 he directed A Midsummer Night's Dream in Regent's Park Open Air Theatre and The Hamlet Project 
for the National Theatre in Bucharest. In 2005 he appeared in David Greig's The Cosmonaut's Last Message... (Donmar Warehouse); Colder Than Here (Soho Theatre), and in the title role in Nathan the Wise (Hampstead Theatre).
		  
He also played a sequence of real-life characters such as Sidney Cockerell in The Best of Friends (Hampstead Theatre 2006), 2007 : Robert Maxwell in The Bargain by Ian Curteis (2007), Charles Dickens in Little Nell by Simon Gray (2007), Wilhelm Furtwangler in Pinter's Taking Sides and Richard Strauss in Collaboration by Ronald Harwood (Chichester and West End, 2008–9) He had previously played the other central role in Taking Sides in the West End, with Pinter directing.

In 2006 he premièred his second one-man show, this one on Shakespeare, Sweet William, and in 2009 he worked with Peter Brook for the first time in Love is My Sin for a European Tour and in New York.

In 2010 he returned to Chichester to play the title role in Ibsen's The Master Builder, and the following year Dr Fabio in The Syndicate by Eduardo de Filippo opposite Ian McKellen. In 2012 he played his fifth consecutive Chichester season as Antony in Antony and Cleopatra opposite Kim Cattrall. Notable performances since then have been as Edgar in Strindberg's The Dance of Death, adapted by Howard Brenton, at the Gate Theatre, as John of Gaunt in Richard II (RSC), and as Anthony Blunt in Alan Bennett's Single Spies, at the Rose Theatre Kingston. In 2014 he performed the title role in King Lear for Theatre for a New Audience in New York, before undertaking a further tour of his solo Shakespeare show Sweet William (Oregon, Tel Aviv, France). He recorded the part of Euripides in Macedonia by David Rudkin for Radio 3, and in 2015 plans to take his solo show Anton Chekhov to Moscow. In 2015 he performed Sweet William in Argentina and Uruguay at the Festival Shakespeare Buenos Aires and Festival Shakespeare Uruguay, organized by Yorick Entertainment Group.

Other work
In 1983 Pennington appeared as Moff Jerjerrod in the Star Wars film Return of the Jedi alongside fellow Old Vic alum James Earl Jones. He also played Michael Foot in The Iron Lady with Meryl Streep; and among his notable TV appearances have been in the title role of Oedipus Rex and in the television movie The Return of Sherlock Holmes. He has also played Holmes's nemesis, Professor Moriarty in two BBC Radio dramatizations of the Holmes short stories The Final Problem in 1992 and The Empty House in 1993. 

He is the author of the book Are You There, Crocodile? which combines biographical material about the Russian playwright Anton Chekhov with an account of the writing of his highly successful one-man show about Chekhov; the full text of which is included. He has also written three books about individual Shakespeare plays, Sweet William - Twenty Thousand Hours with Shakespeare, as well as Let Me Play the Lion Too - How to Be an Actor for Faber and Faber. His solo show Sweet William is available as a DVD. Pennington has also worked as a narrator on many TV documentaries.

In April 2004 he became the second actor, after Harley Granville-Barker in 1925, to deliver the British Academy's annual Shakespeare lecture. The lecture was entitled Barnadine's Straw: The Devil in Shakespeare's Detail.

Personal life
In 1964, Pennington married actress Katharine Barker, with whom he had a son, Mark, before they divorced in 1967. Beginning in 1978, when they appeared together in Love's Labour's Lost, he shared a flat with actress Jane Lapotaire in St John's Wood, London, though at the time Lapotaire said they were "just friends".

Selected stage credits
 Richard II (Earl of Salisbury), National Youth Theatre, Apollo Theatre, London, 9–19 August and 30 August - 2 September 1961
 Henry IV, Part 2 (Earl of Warwick), National Youth Theatre, Apollo Theatre, London, 22–29 August 1961
 Hamlet (title role), ADC Theatre, Cambridge, February 1964
 Love's Labour's Lost (Dumaine and understudying Berowne), Royal Shakespeare Company, Stratford-upon-Avon, 1965
 Hamlet (Fortinbras), RSC, Stratford-upon-Avon and Aldwych Theatre, London, 1965
 The Judge by John Mortimer, Theatre Royal, Brighton and Cambridge Theatre, London, 1967
 Hamlet (Laertes), Round House, London, Lunt-Fontanne Theatre, New York and Huntington Hartford Theatre, Los Angeles, 1969
 Three Sisters (Andrei), Cambridge Arts Theatre, 1971
  Trelawny of the Wells (Ferdinand Gadd), Cambridge Arts Theatre, 1971
 Savages by Christopher Hampton (Crawshaw), Royal Court Theatre and Comedy Theatre, London, 1973
 Measure for Measure (Angelo), RSC, Stratford-upon-Avon, 1974
 The Tempest (Ferdinand), RSC, Stratford-upon-Avon, 1974
 Afore Night Come (Johnny Hobnails), RSC, Stratford-upon-Avon, 1974
 Romeo and Juliet (Mercutio), RSC, Straford-upon-Avon, 1976 and Aldwych Theatre, London, 1977
 Troilus and Cressida (Hector), RSC, Stratford-upon-Avon, 1976 and Aldwych Theatre, London, 1977
  "King Lear" (Edgar), RSC, Stratford-upon-Avon 1976 and Aldwych Theatre London 1977
  Destiny by David Edgar (Major Rolfe), RSC, Stratford-upon-Avon, 1976 and Aldwych Theatre, London, 1977
 The Way of the World (Mirabell), RSC, Aldwych Theatre, London, 1978
 Measure for Measure (the Duke), RSC, Stratford-upon-Avon, 1978 and Aldwych Theatre, London, 1979
 Love's Labour's Lost (Berowne), RSC, Stratford-upon-Avon, 1978 and Aldwych Theatre, London,
 Hippolytus (title role), RSC, Stratford-Upon-Avon, 1978 and The Warehouse, London, 1979
 The White Guard (Shervinsky), RSC, Aldwych Theatre, London, 1979
 The Shadow of a Gunman (Donal Davoren), RSC, Stratford-upon-Avon, 1980 and The Warehouse, London, 1981
 Hamlet (title role), RSC, Stratford-upon-Avon, 1980, Theatre Royal, Newcastle, 1981 and Aldwych Theatre, London, 1981
 Crime and Punishment (Raskolnikov), directed by Yuri Lyubimov, Lyric Hammersmith, London, 1983
 Strider, The Story of a Horse by Mark Rozovsky based on Kholstomer by Leo Tolstoy (title role), Cottesloe Theatre, London, 1984
 Venice Preserv'd (Jaffier), Lyttelton at the Royal National Theatre, London 1984
 Anton Chekhov, his one-man-play about Anton Chekhov (Anton Chekhov), Cottesloe Theatre, London, 1984
 Henry IV Parts One and Two, (Prince Hal), English Shakespeare Company 1986-1989
 Henry V (title role), English Shakespeare Company, 1986-1989
 Richard II (title role), English Shakespeare Company, 1987-1989
 The Winter's Tale (Leontes), English Shakespeare Company 1990-1991
 Coriolanus (title role), English Shakespeare Company 1990-1991
 Macbeth (title role), English Shakespeare Company 1991-1992
 The Gift of the Gorgon by Peter Shaffer (Edward Damson), West End 1992
 The Entertainer (Archie Rice), Hampstead Theatre 1996
 Waste (Henry Trebell), directed by Peter Hall, Old Vic London 1997
 The Seagull (Trigorin), directed by Peter Hall, Old Vic London 1997
 The Provoked Wife (Sir John Brute), directed by Lindsay Posner, Old Vic London, 1997
 The Misanthrope (title role), directed by Peter Hall, Piccadilly Theatre London, 1998
 Filumena (Domenico), directed by Peter Hall, Piccadilly Theatre London 1998
 Gross Indecency (Oscar Wilde), directed by Moises Kaufman, Gielgud Theatre London 1999
 Timon of Athens (title role), directed by Gregory Doran, RSC Stratford and London 1999-2000
 John Gabriel Borkman (title role), English Touring Theatre, 2003
 The Madness of George III (title role) West Yorkshire Playhouse and Birmingham Rep 2003
 The Seagull (Dr Dorn), directed by Peter Stein, Edinburgh Festival 2003
 Sweet William (One man show about Shakespeare) London and international touring, 2007 on
 Collaboration by Ronald Harwood (Richard Strauss), Duchess Theatre London 2009
 "Taking Sides" by Ronald Harwood (Major Steve Arnold), Duchess Theatre London 2009
 The Master Builder by Henrik Ibsen, (title role), Chichester Festival Theatre 2010
 Love Is My Sin directed by Peter Brook, International tour and Broadway 2010
 The Syndicate (Dr Fabio) by Eduardo di Filippo, adapted by Mike Poulton, directed by Sean Mathias, Chichester Festival Theatre 2011
 Judgement Day by Henrik Ibsen, adapted by Mike Poulton, directed by James Dacre, The Print Room 2011
 Antony and Cleopatra (Antony), directed by Janet Suzman Chichester Festival Theatre 2012
 King Lear (title role), directed by Arin Arbus, Theatre for a New Audience at the Polonsky Shakespeare Center, 2013
 King Lear (title role), directed by Michael Webster, national tour, 2016

Filmography

Films

Television

Books
 Rossya: A Journey through Siberia (1977)
 Txèkhov - Un monòleg sobre la vida d'Anton Txèkhov (1989)(Catalan translation of Anton Chekhov) 
 The English Shakespeare Company - The Story of the Wars of the Roses (with Michael Bogdanov) (1990)
 Hamlet: A User's Guide (1996)
 Twelfth Night: A User's Guide (2000)
 Are You There Crocodile? Inventing Anton Chekhov (2003)
 A Pocket Guide to Ibsen, Chekhov and Strindberg (2004)
 A Midsummer Night's Dream: A User's Guide (2005)
 Sweet William: Twenty Thousand Hours with Shakespeare (2012)
 Let Me Play the Lion Too - How to Be an Actor (2015)
 King Lear in Brooklyn (2016)

References

Sweet William: A User's Guide to Shakespeare Nick Hern books, Published 2012

External links

Website dedicated to Michael Pennington

1943 births
Living people
People educated at Marlborough College
Alumni of Trinity College, Cambridge
Royal Shakespeare Company members
English male stage actors
English male television actors
English male film actors
English people of Scottish descent
English people of Welsh descent
People from Cambridge
Male actors from London
National Youth Theatre members